The Mad River is a river in the U.S. state of Washington. It rises in the Cascade Mountains and flows southeast to join the Entiat River. It is part of the Columbia River basin, being a tributary of the Entiat River, which empties into the Columbia River.

See also
 List of rivers of Washington
 List of tributaries of the Columbia River

References

Rivers of Washington (state)
Tributaries of the Columbia River
Rivers of Chelan County, Washington